Juan Manuel De la Rosa (1945 - 2021)  is a painter, engraver, and ceramicist known for his works on handmade paper. He studied lesser-known techniques for painting and papermaking from Japan, Egypt, Fiyi and France; his handmade paper is typically made of linen, cotton, or hemp. With these traditional approaches, he creates layers and adds new dimensions to his artworks.

Born in Sierra Hermosa, Zacatecas, Mexico, de la Rosa studied at the Autonomous University of Nuevo León and La Esmeralda in Mexico City. The Nuevo León government gave him a grant to study and work at Atelier Clot and the National School of Fine Arts in Paris and the Dimitri Papageorgiou workshop in Spain. De la Rosa has taught courses in institutions in Argentina, Colombia, Japan, Puerto Rico, and Venezuela. His works have been exhibited at the Manuel Felguérez Museum of Abstract Art, Zacatecas, Mexico; the Amalgama Gallery, Brussels; and the Mexican Cultural Institute, Paris.

He is survived by his three daughters Alejandra, Natalia and Valentina, and your son Pablo Emiliano.

Biography
Juan Manuel De la Rosa was born in Sierra Hermosa, a small village in the municipality of Villa de Cos, Zacatecas, in 1945. At the age of 17  he studied at the Arts Workshop at the University of Nuevo Leon. In the years 1962 to 1963 he moved to Mexico City to continue his studies at the National School of Painting, Sculpture and Engraving The Esmeralda, the National Institute of Fine Arts (INBA), founded in 1927 under President Plutarco Elias Calles. In the late sixties (1969), he moved to the shoal area to study at the University of Guanajuato. By the University of Nuevo Leon won a scholarship to study at the Atelier Clot, the Bramsen, the Ecole des Beaux Arts in Paris and Dimitri Papaguerguiu workshop in Madrid.

Career
He is a noted painter, engraver, maker of paper and ceramics. Juan Manuel De la Rosa has done throughout his career specialized studies on various techniques of making handmade paper in countries like Egypt, USA and Japan. He has also taught courses in this specialty in different institutions in various countries.

In 2002, during the presentation of the exhibition Barichara vegetables, writer and essayist Silvia Molina referred to Juan Manuel de la Rosa as "an artist's delicate and elegant, making it unique, an artist who has come to make us believe the work process is simple because it has been simplified, or rather, to purify their technique, to deliver a strong work conveys serenity, poise attacking with his inner demons. "

The painter Zacatecas present the exhibition The desert of salt, July 3 at the Headquarters of Art, located in the former Convent of San Francisco, Zacatecas, Zac.
His work has been noted for being humble and smart. He has visited countries such as Venezuela, United States, Switzerland, Belgium, Colombia, Argentina, Spain and several states in Mexico, with solo exhibitions since 1966 with its first exhibition in the Gallery Form the city of Monterrey. Since then has had more than 30 solo exhibitions in cities such as Aguascalientes, Puebla, Zacatecas Mexico City, Guanajuato, Morelia, Buenos Aires, Zurich, Madrid, Brussels, Caracas, San Francisco and Bogota.

Exhibitions

References

External links
 At Museograbado
 At AP Galeria
 At protocolo.com.mx
 Biography at Rogallery.com
 At George Art Prints

1945 births
Mexican artists
People from Zacatecas
Artists from Mexico City
Printmakers
Mexican painters